Torchlight is an unincorporated community and coal town in Lawrence County, Kentucky, United States. The community is named for an annual torchlight parade accident which resulted in the Hotel Greenup being burned to the ground.

References

Unincorporated communities in Lawrence County, Kentucky
Unincorporated communities in Kentucky
Coal towns in Kentucky